This is a list of Louisville Cardinals football players in the NFL Draft.

Selections

Notable undrafted players
Note: No drafts held before 1920

References

Louisville

Louisville Cardinals in the NFL Draft
Louisville Cardinals NFL Draft